David Dykes may refer to:

D. L. Dykes Jr. (David L. Dykes, Jr., 1917–1997), progressive Methodist minister from Shreveport, Louisiana
David O. Dykes (born 1953), conservative Baptist pastor from Tyler, Texas
David Dykes, reporter at The Greenville News

See also
David Dyke (disambiguation)